The Baptist State Convention of Michigan (BSCM) is a group of churches affiliated with the Southern Baptist Convention located in the U.S. state of Michigan.  It is headquartered in Plymouth, Michigan.

Affiliated organizations 
Bambi Lake Baptist Retreat and Conference Center
Michigan Southern Baptist Foundation
The Beacon - the state newspaper

References

External links
Baptist State Convention of Michigan

 

Baptist Christianity in Michigan
Conventions associated with the Southern Baptist Convention